Psalm 74 is the 74th psalm of the Book of Psalms, beginning in English in the King James Version: "O God, why hast thou cast us off for ever?". In the slightly different numbering system used in the Greek Septuagint and Latin Vulgate translations of the Bible, this psalm is Psalm 73. In Latin, it is known as "Ut quid Deus reppulisti in finem iratus". Subheaded a maschil or contemplation, and a community lament, it expresses the pleas of the Jewish community in the Babylonian captivity. It is attributed to Asaph.

The psalm forms a regular part of Jewish, Catholic, Lutheran, Anglican and other Protestant liturgies. It has been set to music, notably in Bach's Gott ist mein König, BWV 71. Several composers set the psalm or verses from it in the 20th and 21st centuries.

Text

King James Version 
 O God, why hast thou cast us off for ever? why doth thine anger smoke against the sheep of thy pasture?
 Remember thy congregation, which thou hast purchased of old; the rod of thine inheritance, which thou hast redeemed; this mount Zion, wherein thou hast dwelt.
 Lift up thy feet unto the perpetual desolations; even all that the enemy hath done wickedly in the sanctuary.
 Thine enemies roar in the midst of thy congregations; they set up their ensigns for signs.
 A man was famous according as he had lifted up axes upon the thick trees.
 But now they break down the carved work thereof at once with axes and hammers.
 They have cast fire into thy sanctuary, they have defiled by casting down the dwelling place of thy name to the ground.
 They said in their hearts, Let us destroy them together: they have burned up all the synagogues of God in the land.
 We see not our signs: there is no more any prophet: neither is there among us any that knoweth how long.
 O God, how long shall the adversary reproach? shall the enemy blaspheme thy name for ever?
 Why withdrawest thou thy hand, even thy right hand? pluck it out of thy bosom.
 For God is my King of old, working salvation in the midst of the earth.
 Thou didst divide the sea by thy strength: thou brakest the heads of the dragons in the waters.
 Thou brakest the heads of leviathan in pieces, and gavest him to be meat to the people inhabiting the wilderness.
 Thou didst cleave the fountain and the flood: thou driedst up mighty rivers.
 The day is thine, the night also is thine: thou hast prepared the light and the sun.
 Thou hast set all the borders of the earth: thou hast made summer and winter.
 Remember this, that the enemy hath reproached, O LORD, and that the foolish people have blasphemed thy name.
 O deliver not the soul of thy turtledove unto the multitude of the wicked: forget not the congregation of thy poor for ever.
 Have respect unto the covenant: for the dark places of the earth are full of the habitations of cruelty.
 O let not the oppressed return ashamed: let the poor and needy praise thy name.
 Arise, O God, plead thine own cause: remember how the foolish man reproacheth thee daily.
 Forget not the voice of thine enemies: the tumult of those that rise up against thee increaseth continually.

Content 
Verses 1–3 open this psalm by imploring God to "remember your people", and to "remember Mount Zion". The psalm continues in verses 3b to 11 by describing the destruction of the Temple by "the enemies of God". Verses 12–17 recall and praise the might of God, and the psalm ends (verses 18–23) by imploring the Lord (verse 18) to remember Israel and come to her aid.

The enemy is not named, but may refer to King Nebuchadnezzar. According to the Targum, the reference is to Antiochus Epiphanes.

Verse 1 portrays the image of the people of Israel as God's flock, "the sheep of your pasture".

Uses

Judaism 
 Psalm 74 is recited on the fast of the Tenth of Tevet in some traditions.
 It is recited on the second day of Passover in some traditions.
 Verses 2 and 12 are recited during the blessings before the Shema on the second day of Rosh Hashanah.

Christian churches 
In the Church of England's Book of Common Prayer, this psalm is appointed to be read on the evening of the fourteenth day of the month.

Musical settings 
Heinrich Schütz set Psalm 74 in a metred version in German, "Dennoch hat Israel zum Trost", SWV 171, as part of the Becker Psalter, first published in 1628.

In his 1708 cantata Gott ist mein König, BWV 71, Bach used three verses from the psalm.

Pavel Chesnokov composed "Salvation is Created'''" as a choral work in 1912, the fifth in his Ten Communion Hymns, scored for six voices (SATTBB), as a communion hymn based on verse 12 in Russian and on a synodal Kievan chant melody.

Max Drischner composed a setting of verse 16, added to Psalm 4: 7, 9, as the final movement of his Tübinger Psalmen for voice, violin and organ, or choir, melody instrument and keyboard instrument, in 1948. Stefans Grové set the psalm for mezzo-soprano, flute and harp in 1974. 

Ernani Aguiar composed a choral setting in Latin, Salmo 74'', in 2001.

References

External links 

 
 
  in Hebrew and English, Mechon-mamre
 Text of Psalm 74 according to the 1928 Psalter
 A maskil of Asaph. Why, God, have you cast us off forever? (text and footnotes) United States Conference of Catholic Bishops
 Psalm 74 – Asking God to Remember His Destroyed Sanctuary (text and detailed commentary) enduringword.com
 Psalm 74:1 (introduction and text) Bible study tools
 Psalm 74/ Refrain: Arise, O God, maintain your own cause. Church of England
 Psalm 74 Bible gateway
 Charles H. Spurgeon: Psalm 74 (commentary) spurgeon.org

Leviathan
074